KOLA (99.9 FM) is a commercial radio station licensed to Redlands, California, and broadcasting to the Riverside-San Bernardino-Inland Empire radio market.  It is owned by the Anaheim Broadcasting Corporation and it airs a classic hits radio format.  Its studios are on Orange Tree Lane in Redlands, California.

KOLA has an effective radiated power (ERP) of 29,500 watts.  Adding in its tower that is taller than the Empire State Building, KOLA is considered a "superpower" FM station.  The transmitter is on Box Spring Mountain Road amid other FM and TV towers for Inland Empire stations.

History

Easy Listening
The station's original call sign was KFMW. The transmitter was located on Box Springs Mountain southeast of Riverside. 

The format was a mix of easy listening, middle of the road (MOR) and beautiful music.  Rogan Jones served as the original general manager.

Top 40 and Album Rock
Frederick Coté and Chester Coleman bought the station in 1965. Coté bought out Coleman's half-interest at the end of 1969. The call letters were changed to KOLA.  

The format flipped to Top 40, concentrating on rhythmic hits. In the winter of 1970–71, KOLA moved its studios to the Mission Inn in downtown Riverside.  In 1980, the station switched to Album Rock with Ted Ziegenbusch as the programming consultant through 1987. In 1987 the station switched back to Top 40 music.

Oldies and Classic Hits
In the 1990s KOLA changed its format to Oldies from the 1950s, '60s and '70s.  Over time, the 1950s songs were deleted and 1980s songs were added.  Around 2007, most of the 1960s hits were dropped as the station concentrated on the hits of the 1970s and 1980s. By spring of 2013, KOLA had dropped all the 1960s oldies and switched to a 1970s-80s-90s Classic Hits format. In 2018, KOLA dropped most of the 1970s hits and began adding songs from the early 2000s.

KOLA continues to broadcast from the same tower at the same 29,500 watts, as was stated on its original license from 1959 as KFMW.

References

External links
Official Website

List of "grandfathered" FM radio stations in the U.S.

OLA
Classic hits radio stations in the United States
Radio stations established in 1968